Simeon Baldwin (December 14, 1761 – May 26, 1851) was son-in-law of Roger Sherman, father of Connecticut Governor and US Senator Roger Sherman Baldwin, grandfather of Connecticut Governor & Chief Justice Simeon Eben Baldwin and great-grandfather of New York Supreme Court Justice Edward Baldwin Whitney.  He was born in Norwich in the Connecticut Colony.  He completed preparatory studies (studying with Rev. Joseph Huntington and later at the Master Tisdale's School in Lebanon, Connecticut, and graduated from Yale College in 1781.  He delivered the Latin oration in June 1782, it is still preserved in the Yale University Library.  He was preceptor of the academy at Albany, and a Tutor at his alma mater.

He then studied law, was admitted to the bar, and commenced practice in New Haven. He was elected New Haven city clerk in 1790 was appointed clerk of the District and Circuit Courts of the United States for the District of Connecticut and served until November 1803, when he resigned, having been elected to Congress.  Baldwin was elected as a Federalist to the Eighth Congress (March 4, 1803 – March 3, 1805).

He declined to be a candidate for reelection, and was again appointed to his former clerkship, but was removed by Judge Edwards in 1806.  He served as associate judge of the Superior Court (1806–08) and the Connecticut Supreme Court of Errors (1808–18).  He was president of the board of commissioners that located the Farmington Canal, and was Mayor of New Haven. He died at 89 years old and was interred at Grove Street Cemetery.

He married Rebecca, daughter of Hon. Roger Sherman, who died on September 4, 1795, and then married her sister Elizabeth Sherman Burr.

References
American National Biography, vol. 2, pp. 64–65.

External links
Simeon Baldwin Connecticut State Library
US Representative Simeon Baldwin US Congressional Biography

Sherman Genealogy Including Families of Essex, Suffolk and Norfolk, England By Thomas Townsend Sherman
Life and letters if Simeon Baldwin
From Alexander Hamilton to Simeon Baldwin, 1 May 1802
Guide to Research Collections
Baldwin Family Papers (MS 55). Manuscripts and Archives, Yale University Library.
Baldwin-Greene-Gager family of Connecticut at Political Graveyard
Sherman-Hoar family at Political Graveyard

1761 births
1851 deaths
Mayors of New Haven, Connecticut
Connecticut state court judges
Justices of the Connecticut Supreme Court
Yale College alumni
Burials at Grove Street Cemetery
Federalist Party members of the United States House of Representatives from Connecticut
Sherman family (U.S.)